Below are lists of films produced in Hong Kong in the decade of the 2000s.

List of Hong Kong films of 2000
List of Hong Kong films of 2001
List of Hong Kong films of 2002
List of Hong Kong films of 2003
List of Hong Kong films of 2004
List of Hong Kong films of 2005
List of Hong Kong films of 2006
List of Hong Kong films of 2007
List of Hong Kong films of 2008
List of Hong Kong films of 2009

See also
List of films set in Hong Kong

External links
 IMDB list of Hong Kong films

Films
Hong Kong